Sphinxkopf Peak is the peak (1,630 m) at the northern end of Sphinx Mountain, in the northern Wohlthat Mountains of Queen Maud Land. Discovered by the German Antarctic Expedition under Ritscher, 1938–39, who named it Sphinxkopf (sphinx head) because of its appearance.

Mountains of Queen Maud Land
Princess Astrid Coast